The Mofan Street is a street in Jincheng Township, Kinmen County, Fukien Province, Republic of China (Taiwan).

Name
The street gets its name from the uniform hybrid architecture of Chinese and Western styles which means Model Street.

History
The construction of the street started in 1924 when the President of Kinmen Junior Chamber Fu His-chi held a fundraising drive among overseas Chinese. The street was completed in 1925.

Architecture
The 75 meter long street features buildings with brick exteriors and arched door fronts modeled after the Japanese, Fujian and Western architecture. There are 16 buildings at each side connected by a common arcade.

See also
 List of roads in Taiwan

References

1925 establishments in China
Jincheng Township
Streets in Taiwan
Transportation in Kinmen County